Manasseh Azure Awuni, is Ghanaian investigative journalist and the Editor-in-Chief of The Fourth Estate. He previously worked with Multimedia Group Limited in Accra, Ghana. 

His investigative and anti-corruption reports have caused national uproar and resulted in some government officials going to prison. He spends his leisure time speaking at youth programmes and anti-corruption seminars.

Azure has won various awards for his works including the journalist of the year at the West Africa Media Excellence Awards in 2019 and 2020.

Education
Born in Bongo in the Upper East Region, Azure moved to Kete-Krachi in the Volta Region where he completed his secondary education at Krachi Senior High School. He proceeded to the Ghana Institute of Journalism where he obtained a Bachelor of Arts in Communication Studies and, later, a Master of Arts degree in communication studies at the University of Ghana.

Career 
Manasseh Azure Awuni is currently the Editor-in-Chief, The Fourth Estate which is a non-profit, public-interest journalism project founded by the Media Foundation for West Africa (MFWA). 

Azure began his career as a freelance journalist before joining the Multimedia Group Limited in 2012. where he was the head of investigation at Joy FM and Joy News, subsidiaries of MGL.

Controversies
Azure's work has always stirred national controversy, notably concerning the Mahama Ford saga. He broke a story in 2016 when the then president, John Mahama, received a Ford Expedition gift from a Burkinabé contractor. Many groups called for an investigation into the saga. The gift was believed to be a return favour for a contract given to the businessman. The story damaged Mahama's second term bid.

In 2019, Azure and Joy FM broadcast a documentary titled "Militia in the heart of the nation" which detailed how a private and unlicensed security group affiliated to the governing New Patriotic Party operated from the seat of a government annexe, the Osu Castle. The government denied the story, as expected, but various government spokespersons contradicted one another.

The De-Eye group also sued Azure and the media house. The group abandoned the suit when Azure and the Multimedia Group filed their defence. The journalist has however, won similar defamation suits against those he has investigated.

Books 
 The Fourth John: Reign, Rejection and Rebound
 Letters to My Future Wife
 Voice of Conscience

Awards 
Manasseh is a receipient of several awards: 
 2022: Nominee for the Allard Prize for International Integrity
 2022: Longlist for One World Media Awards (Popular Features Category)
 2021: Ghana’s Integrity Personality of the Year, Awarded by GII, Ghana Chapter of Transparency International
 2021: Millennium Excellence Award for Media Excellence
 2021: 2nd Prize for Norbert Zongo Africa Investigative Journalism Award
 2020: Overall Best Journalist for West Africa, West Africa Media Excellence Award 
 2018: Overall Best Journalist for West Africa, West Africa Media Excellence Award 
 2012: 2011 Ghana Journalists Association Best Journalist of the Year 
 2011: 2010 Ghana Journalists Association Most Promising Journalist of the Year 
 2020: Best Anti-Corruption Journalist for West Africa; West Africa Media Excellence Award
 2018: Best Anti-Corruption Journalist for West Africa; West Africa Media Excellence Award
 2017: Best Investigative Journalist for West Africa; West Africa Media Excellence Award
 2012: National Youth Achievers Award for Media Excellence
 2014: Ghana Journalists Association Best Anti-Corruption Reporter
 2014: Ghana Journalists Association Best Radio News Reporter
 2013: Ghana Journalists Association Best TV News Reporter
 2012: Ghana Journalists Association Best TV News Reporter
 2012: Ghana Journalists Association Best Reporter on Sanitation
 2012: Ghana Journalists Association Best Features Writer
 2012: Overall Winner of Ideas Award of Ghanaian Achievers Under 40
 2012: Ghana Journalists Association 1st Runner Up in Sports Reporting, 2012
 2011: Ghana Journalists Association Best TV News Reporter
 2011: Ghana Journalists Association Best Human Rights Reporter
 2007: Winner: (Tertiary Level) 2007 National Emancipation Day Essay Competition,

References 

Living people
Ghanaian radio journalists
1985 births
Ghanaian investigative journalists
University of Ghana alumni